Lepista luscina is a species of fungus belonging to the family Tricholomataceae.

It has cosmopolitan distribution.

References

luscina